Watertown Township, Michigan may refer to one of the following townships the U.S. state of Michigan:

 Watertown Charter Township, Michigan
 Watertown Township, Sanilac County, Michigan
 Watertown Township, Tuscola County, Michigan

See also

 Watertown Township (disambiguation)

Michigan township disambiguation pages